Saeed Khani (born January 21, 1981) is a former Iranian footballer

Club career
Khani has spent a significant portion of his career playing for F.C. Aboumoslem. He currently serves as the captain of his team.

Club career statistics

 Assist Goals

References

1981 births
Living people
Iranian footballers
Association football midfielders
Persian Gulf Pro League players
F.C. Aboomoslem players
Payam Mashhad players
Saba players
Esteghlal Ahvaz players
People from Nishapur